Tambolaka Airport is an airport in Tambolaka, Southwest Sumba Regency, East Nusa Tenggara, Indonesia . It inaugurated a new terminal in 2015, which improved passenger services from the previous terminal. A cafe and shops are available at the terminal, and there are a car park and some taxi stands outside the terminal.

Terminals, airlines and destinations

Accidents and incidents
 On February 11, 2006, Adam Air Flight 782, registration number PK-KKE, lost navigational and communications systems twenty minutes into a flight from Jakarta to Makassar, South Sulawesi. The plane was subsequently flown into a radar "black spot" and was lost for several hours, eventually making an emergency landing at Tambolaka Airport, Sumba (on a different island 481 km away from their intended destination, and southeast from their origin, instead of north-east). The pilot in that incident was fired. Adam Air broke multiple safety regulations, including removing an aircraft before it was due for inspection by aviation authorities.

References

External links 

Airports in East Nusa Tenggara